Robert J. Berman is a Swedish mathematical scientist currently at Chalmers University and was awarded the Göran Gustafsson Prize in 2017. Berman is known for his constributions to the K-stability of Fano varieties.

References

Academic staff of the Chalmers University of Technology
Chalmers University of Technology alumni
Swedish mathematicians
Living people
Year of birth missing (living people)
Members of the Royal Swedish Academy of Sciences